The Tušanj City Stadium, commonly known as Tušanj Stadium is a multi-purpose stadium in Tuzla, Bosnia and Herzegovina, which is used mostly for football matches and is the home ground of FK Sloboda Tuzla and FK Tuzla City. The stadium has a capacity of around 7,200 seated.

International matches
On 4 September 2014, it hosted a friendly match of Bosnia and Herzegovina against Liechtenstein and finished with the result 3–0.

References

External links
Tušanj City Stadium at EU-Football.info

Sport in Tuzla
Stadium
Multi-purpose stadiums in Bosnia and Herzegovina
Football venues in Bosnia and Herzegovina
Football venues in Yugoslavia
Athletics (track and field) venues in Bosnia and Herzegovina
Athletics (track and field) venues in Yugoslavia
Sports venues completed in 1957
1957 establishments in Bosnia and Herzegovina
Buildings and structures in Tuzla